Springtown may refer to:

in Canada
 Springtown, Ontario

in Northern Ireland
 Springtown Camp, a former housing area near Derry City, Co. Londonderry, Northern Ireland
 Springtown, County Tyrone, a townland in County Tyrone, Northern Ireland

in the United States
 Springtown, Arkansas
 Springtown, California
 Springtown, Indiana
 Springtown, New Jersey in Cumberland County
 Springtown, Warren County, New Jersey
 Springtown Stagecoach Inn, listed on the NRHP in Warren County, New Jersey
 Springtown, Bucks County, Pennsylvania
Springtown Historic District
 Springtown, Franklin County, Pennsylvania
 Springtown, Luzerne County, Pennsylvania, a place in Pennsylvania
 Springtown, Northumberland County, Pennsylvania, a place in Pennsylvania
 Springtown, Texas
Springtown Independent School District